The 1972 Denver Broncos season was the team's 13th season in professional football and third in the National Football League (NFL). Under first-year head coach and general manager John Ralston, the Broncos finished with five wins and nine losses, third in the AFC West Division.

Hired in early January, Ralston was previously the head coach for nine years at Stanford University; in his final two seasons, he led the Indians to consecutive Pac-8 titles and upset victories in the Rose Bowl.

Offseason

NFL draft

Personnel

Staff

Roster

Regular season

Schedule

Standings

References

External links
Denver Broncos – 1972 media guide
1972 Denver Broncos at Pro-Football-Reference.com

Denver Broncos seasons
Denver Broncos
Denver Broncos season